Ostredok (1,596 m above sea level) is the highest hill of the Great Fatra, at the same time in the National Park Veľká Fatra. It lies in the main ridge of the mountain. It has two peaks, the main southern (1,596 m above sea level) and a few meters lower north (1,593 m above sea level). The peaks are luminous, providing an undisturbed circular view. The slopes of Ostredok are smoothly modeled, steep, in winter there is a danger of avalanche dropping.

The 49 km long Great-Frontier Highway is marked by the red tourist sign marked with a red tourist mark. [1]

In Slovakia there are up to six hills called Ostredok. [2] [3]

References 

Veľká Fatra
Mountains of the Western Carpathians
Mountains of Slovakia